P. malabaricus may refer to:

Phaeanthus malabaricus, a plant species
Pseudorhabdosynochus malabaricus, a fish parasite
Psilopogon malabaricus, the Malabar barbet, a fish species